Ascalista letourneuxi is a species of sea snail in the family Columbellidae.

Distribution
This marine species occurs off the Austral Islands,  French Polynesia.

References

 Monsecour K. & Monsecour D. (2015). New species of Columbellidae (Mollusca: Gastropoda) from French Polynesia. Gloria Maris. 54(2): 91-97.

letourneuxi
Gastropods described in 2015